Cheating Vegas is a documentary television series previously airing on Destination America. The series is about the illegal industry of cheating in casinos, featuring interviews with several infamous cheaters and informative information, topped off with real security camera footage of cheaters in the act. The show also includes talks from Nevada Gaming Control Board members about the different cheaters involved. The show debuted in 2012, and is currently not airing any new episodes.

Plot
The show is a compilation of security camera footage, phone calls to prisoners known to cheat in Vegas, and talks with Nevada Gaming members. As casino employees have noticed, if there's money involved, there are unscrupulous people out there willing to grab it. Real security camera footage probably unseen anywhere else allows viewers to have a look at the daily cheaters' main job. Many forms of cheating are included, such as point shaving, rigging slot machines, and manipulating the game of craps.

Not addressed is the matter of casinos cheating patrons, although the Nevada Gaming Control Board certainly has such cases in its files.

Episodes

Cheating Vegas

References

2012 American television series debuts
2010s American documentary television series
Destination America original programming
Cheating in gambling